Villarrubia de los Ojos is a municipality of Spain located in the province of Ciudad Real, Castilla–La Mancha. The municipality spans across a total area of 281.86 km2 and, as of 1 January 2020, it has a registered population of 9,762.

Geography
The Ojos del Guadiana are located within the Villarrubia de los Ojos municipal territory. They are the source of the Guadiana river, the fourth longest river of the Iberian peninsula. There's also a National Park, the Tablas de Daimiel National Park located in the Tablas de Daimiel wetlands, shared with the neighbouring municipality, Daimiel.

The landforms of Villarrubia de los Ojos are mountainous in the north and flat in the south. The weather is quite strong with very cold winters and very hot summers. There are some mountains over 1,200 metres and the flat zone is at 550 metres above sea level in the Spanish central plateau.

History 
Control over the territory passed from the Order of St. John of Jerusalem to the Order of Calatrava on the wake of the 1212 Battle of Las Navas de Tolosa. The demarcation of the area in the concord of 1232 confirmed the Calatravan control of Villarrubia.

Together with Aldea del Rey, Almagro, Bolaños and Daimiel, Villarrubia was one of the five towns of the Campo de Calatrava. By the end of the middle ages, Villarrubia, like the rest of the Campo de Calatrava, featured a quite large mudéjar population. In 1502, the Catholic Monarchs granted local moriscos from Villarrubia (and the wider Campo) tax exemptions, as if they were for all legal purposes old christians. Following the two expulsions from 1611 and 1612, most of the expelled moriscos were able to return to Villarrubia.

References

Bibliography

External links

 Web of the City Hall of Villarrubia de los Ojos

Municipalities in the Province of Ciudad Real